Lsjbot is an automated Wikipedia article-creating program, or Wikipedia bot, developed by Sverker Johansson for the Swedish Wikipedia. The bot primarily focuses on articles about living organisms and geographical entities (such as rivers, dams, and mountains).

According to its description page on the Swedish Wikipedia, Lsjbot was active in the Swedish and Waray Wikipedias and is currently active in the Cebuano Wikipedia, and has created most Wikipedia articles in those languages (between 80% and 99% of the total).

During 2020, Lsjbot was only performing maintenance on the Cebuano Wikipedia, with no major article creation projects underway.

History 

The program was responsible for 2.7 million articles as of 2014 (at a rate of 10,000 articles per day), and 9.5 million articles as of January 2019 (at a rate of 4,000 per day), two-thirds of which appear in the Cebuano language Wikipedia (the native language of Johansson's wife); the other third appear in the Swedish Wikipedia. 

On June 15, 2013, the Swedish Wikipedia hit one million articles, the eighth language on Wikipedia to reach that goal. The millionth article was created by Lsjbot – which at that point had created 454,000 articles, almost half of the entire article count of the Swedish Wikipedia. Lsjbot was also responsible for helping the Swedish Wikipedia become the second edition of Wikipedia to reach 2 million articles, which as of 2022 is the  largest edition of Wikipedia behind English, Cebuano and German.

In February 2020, Vice reported that Lsjbot was responsible for over 24 million of 29.5 million edits at Cebuano Wikipedia, now the world's second largest Wikipedia, with bots comprising all but five of the site's top 35 editors and no human editors in the top 10. However, Lsjbot is no longer creating new articles at the Swedish and Waray-Waray Wikipedias. Sverker Johansson explained that "opinions shifted" within the Swedish Wikipedia community and Waray-Waray editors were unable to form a consensus about the automatic creation of articles.

On the Swedish Wikipedia, since early 2017, around 900,000 articles written by Lsjbot have been deleted, due to a lack of adequate documentation or because of other reasons. Apart from these already-deleted articles, as of 26 December 2021, a further number of approximately 200,000 articles await deletion. 

Overall, starting in 2017, there was an initial pace of approximately 20,000 to 40,000 deletions of Lsjbot-made articles per year, but since July 2020 the pace of deletions has greatly accelerated. In just one year, from July 2020 to December 2021, Swedish Wikipedia fell from 3.72 million articles to 2.79 million articles. Furthermore, since July 2020, the deletion rate has occasionally exceeded 5,000 per day.

Media coverage 
Its operation has generated some criticism, from those who suggest the stub articles lack meaningful content and a human touch. The Sydney Morning Herald compared the bot to Phil Parker, allegedly the most published author in human history, who has published over 85,000 books, each of which is completed in less than an hour using computers. Popular Science compared the bot to the announcement in July 2014 by the Associated Press that it planned to use bots to write articles. Johansson countered attacks on his methods by appealing to problems of gender bias on Wikipedia, noting that if the bot does not write articles, "otherwise they're mainly written by young, white, male nerds and reflect male interests."

References

External links

 Source code of Lsjbot
  

Internet bots
Internet in Sweden
Wikipedia controversies